White Township is a township in Warren County, in the U.S. state of New Jersey. As of the 2020 United States census, the township's population was 4,606, a decrease of 276 (−5.7%) from the 2010 census count of 4,882, which in turn reflected an increase of 637 (+15.0%) from the 4,245 counted in the 2000 census. 

White Township was incorporated as a township by an act of the New Jersey Legislature on April 9, 1913, from portions of Oxford Township, based on the results of a referendum held on May 1, 1913, making it the second-youngest township in the county.  The township was named after Alexander White, who came to the area sometime before 1760 and built a stone mansion called "The White House" near a place called Roxburg.

Geography
According to the United States Census Bureau, the township had a total area of 27.90 square miles (72.27 km2), including 27.37 square miles (70.88 km2) of land and 0.54 square miles (1.39 km2) of water (1.92%).

Bridgeville (with a 2010 Census population of 106), Brookfield (675) and Buttzville (146) are census-designated places and unincorporated communities located within the township.

Other unincorporated communities, localities and place names located partially or completely within the township include Cornish, Foul Rift, Hazen, Little York, Manunka Chunk, Sarepta and Summerfield.

Mount No More is a mountain that is part of the New York–New Jersey Highlands of the Appalachian Mountains.

White Township borders the Warren County municipalities of Belvidere, Harmony Township, Hope Township, Knowlton Township, Liberty Township, Oxford Township and Washington Township.

Demographics

The Township's economic data (as is all of Warren County) is calculated by the US Census Bureau as part of the Lehigh Valley / Allentown-Bethlehem-Easton, PA-NJ metropolitan statistical area.

2010 census

The Census Bureau's 2006–2010 American Community Survey showed that (in 2010 inflation-adjusted dollars) median household income was $68,247 (with a margin of error of +/− $5,170) and the median family income was $81,975 (+/− $7,157). Males had a median income of $57,222 (+/− $15,520) versus $49,022 (+/− $7,746) for females. The per capita income for the borough was $36,964 (+/− $3,448). About 4.2% of families and 4.0% of the population were below the poverty line, including 2.4% of those under age 18 and 3.8% of those age 65 or over.

2000 census
As of the 2000 United States census there were 4,245 people, 1,668 households, and 1,179 families residing in the township. The population density was 155.1 people per square mile (59.9/km2). There were 1,770 housing units at an average density of 64.7 per square mile (25.0/km2). The racial makeup of the township was 96.35% White, 1.20% African American, 0.19% Native American, 0.61% Asian, 0.05% Pacific Islander, 0.33% from other races, and 1.27% from two or more races. Hispanic or Latino of any race were 2.12% of the population.

There were 1,668 households, out of which 28.2% had children under the age of 18 living with them, 60.6% were married couples living together, 7.0% had a female householder with no husband present, and 29.3% were non-families. 25.2% of all households were made up of individuals, and 13.8% had someone living alone who was 65 years of age or older. The average household size was 2.47 and the average family size was 2.98.

In the township the population was spread out, with 22.3% under the age of 18, 5.7% from 18 to 24, 28.2% from 25 to 44, 25.6% from 45 to 64, and 18.2% who were 65 years of age or older. The median age was 42 years. For every 100 females, there were 100.1 males. For every 100 females age 18 and over, there were 98.0 males.

The median income for a household in the township was $54,732, and the median income for a family was $66,127. Males had a median income of $49,044 versus $35,000 for females. The per capita income for the township was $24,783. About 2.2% of families and 4.9% of the population were below the poverty line, including 3.6% of those under age 18 and 4.8% of those age 65 or over.

Government

Local government 
White Township is governed under the Township form of New Jersey municipal government, one of 141 municipalities (of the 564) statewide that use this form, the second-most commonly used form of government in the state. The governing body is comprised of a three-member Township Committee, whose members are elected directly by the voters at-large in partisan elections to serve three-year terms of office on a staggered basis, with one or seat coming up for election each year as part of the November general election in a three-year cycle. At an annual reorganization meeting, the Township Committee selects one of its members to serve as Mayor.

, members of the White Township Committee are Mayor Jeff Herb (R, term on committee and as mayor ends December 31, 2022), Deputy Mayor Anne Marie Skoog (R, term on committee ends 2023; term as deputy mayor ends 2022) and Arnold G. Hyndman (I, 2024).

Federal, state, and county representation 
White Township is located in the 7th Congressional District and is part of New Jersey's 24th state legislative district. 

Prior to the 2011 reapportionment following the 2010 Census, White Township had been in the 23rd state legislative district.

Politics
As of March 2011, there were a total of 3,355 registered voters in White Township, of which 545 (16.2% vs. 21.5% countywide) were registered as Democrats, 1,727 (51.5% vs. 35.3%) were registered as Republicans and 1,077 (32.1% vs. 43.1%) were registered as Unaffiliated. There were 6 voters registered as Libertarians or Greens. Among the township's 2010 Census population, 68.7% (vs. 62.3% in Warren County) were registered to vote, including 82.8% of those ages 18 and over (vs. 81.5% countywide). In the 2012 presidential election, Republican Mitt Romney received 1,540 votes here (65.8% vs. 56.0% countywide), ahead of Democrat Barack Obama with 722 votes (30.9% vs. 40.8%) and other candidates with 38 votes (1.6% vs. 1.7%), among the 2,340 ballots cast by the township's 3,383 registered voters, for a turnout of 69.2% (vs. 66.7% in Warren County).

In the 2012 presidential election, Republican Mitt Romney received 67.0% of the vote (1,540 cast), ahead of Democrat Barack Obama with 31.4% (722 votes), and other candidates with 1.7% (38 votes), among the 2,340 ballots cast by the township's 3,383 registered voters (40 ballots were spoiled), for a turnout of 69.2%. In the 2008 presidential election, Republican John McCain received 1,636 votes (61.6% vs. 55.2% countywide), ahead of Democrat Barack Obama with 891 votes (33.5% vs. 41.4%) and other candidates with 50 votes (1.9% vs. 1.6%), among the 2,656 ballots cast by the township's 3,431 registered voters, for a turnout of 77.4% (vs. 73.4% in Warren County). In the 2004 presidential election, Republican George W. Bush received 1,690 votes (64.6% vs. 61.0% countywide), ahead of Democrat John Kerry with 871 votes (33.3% vs. 37.2%) and other candidates with 44 votes (1.7% vs. 1.3%), among the 2,618 ballots cast by the township's 3,255 registered voters, for a turnout of 80.4% (vs. 76.3% in the whole county).

In the 2013 gubernatorial election, Republican Chris Christie received 79.3% of the vote (1,165 cast), ahead of Democrat Barbara Buono with 17.8% (261 votes), and other candidates with 2.9% (43 votes), among the 1,515 ballots cast by the township's 3,417 registered voters (46 ballots were spoiled), for a turnout of 44.3%. In the 2009 gubernatorial election, Republican Chris Christie received 1,189 votes here (62.6% vs. 61.3% countywide), ahead of Democrat Jon Corzine with 440 votes (23.2% vs. 25.7%), Independent Chris Daggett with 210 votes (11.1% vs. 9.8%) and other candidates with 24 votes (1.3% vs. 1.5%), among the 1,899 ballots cast by the township's 3,349 registered voters, yielding a 56.7% turnout (vs. 49.6% in the county).

Education
The White Township School District serves public school students in pre-kindergarten through eighth grade at White Township Consolidated School. As of the 2021–22 school year, the district, comprised of one school, had an enrollment of 256 students and 32.1 classroom teachers (on an FTE basis), for a student–teacher ratio of 8.0:1.

Public school students in grades nine through twelve from Harmony Township, Hope Township and White Township attend Belvidere High School as part of sending/receiving relationships with the Belvidere School District. As of the 2021–22 school year, the high school had an enrollment of 357 students and 32.3 classroom teachers (on an FTE basis), for a student–teacher ratio of 11.1:1.

Students from the township and from all of Warren County are eligible to attend Ridge and Valley Charter School in Frelinghuysen Township (for grades K–8) or Warren County Technical School in Washington borough (for 9–12), with special education services provided by local districts supplemented throughout the county by the Warren County Special Services School District in Oxford Township (for Pre-K–12).

Transportation

U.S. Route 46 passes through the northern part of the township while Route 31 passes through briefly in the east before ending at Route 46. The major county road that passes through is CR 519.

Two limited access roads provide access to the municipality: Interstate 78/U.S. 22 in neighboring Franklin and Interstate 80 in neighboring Knowlton Township and Hope Township.

Landmarks and places of interest
Regular meetings of the Warren County Board of County Commissioners are held at the Wayne Dumont Jr. Administrative Building in White Township, which also houses most of the administrative offices of Warren County. 

Part of the Pequest Fish Hatchery also lies within the boundaries of White Township. 

Four Sisters Winery is located in White Township.

Notable people

People who were born in, residents of, or otherwise closely associated with White Township include:

 John Insley Blair (1802–1899), entrepreneur, railroad magnate, philanthropist and one of the 19th century's wealthiest men
 Charles W. Buttz (1837–1913), member of the United States House of Representatives from South Carolina

References

External links

Township website

 
1913 establishments in New Jersey
Populated places established in 1913
Township form of New Jersey government
Townships in Warren County, New Jersey
New Jersey populated places on the Delaware River